Sadhu Aur Shaitaan is a 1968 Hindi film directed by A. Bhimsingh. The film stars Om Prakash, Pran in title roles, with Mehmood, Bharathi, Kishore Kumar in lead roles. The movie is a remake of 1966 Tamil suspense-comedy Sadhu Mirandal.

Plot 
Innocent and honest Bajrang drives a taxi and helps everyone. He is devoted to another kind-hearted gentleman Mr. Sadhuram who is a bank employee. Bajrang is attracted to a schoolteacher, Vidya. Vidya's brother Dina Nath is a Drama Artist. One day a man claiming to be a childhood friend of Sadhuram, named Sher Khan, enters their lives. His motive is to rob the bank where Sadhuram is employed and blame Sadhuram for this. He manipulates Sadhuram into accepting him and moves in with him. He borrows a large sum of money from Sadhuram, and also manages to duplicate the bank's safe's key, and steals the money. The Bank Manager (Nasir Hussain) notifies the police of the robbery and Sadhuram becomes the prime suspect. In panic Sadhuram, who comes into possession of the money that Sher Khan has stolen, flees with the police on his tail. Sher Khan (alias dacoit Dilawar Singh) is killed and his dead body ends up in the back seat of Bajrang's taxi, and Bajrang too is on the run. No one can clear them of the crime because Dilawar Singh is dead.

Cast 

 Om Prakash as Sadhuram
 Pran as Daku Dilawar Singh / Sher Khan / Sardar Jarnail Singh
 Mehmood as Bajrang "Birju"
 Bharathi as Vidya Shastri 
 Kishore Kumar as Pandit Dinanath Shastri 
 Nazir Hussain as Bank Manager
 Anwar Hussain as Police Inspector
 Mukri as Krishnamurthy
 Jankidas as Jankidas 
 Dulari as Ramdey
 Tun Tun as Sundari
 Vijayalalitha as Cabaret Dancer

Uncredited Special Appearance 
 Ashok Kumar as Hair Dresser
 Sunil Dutt as Catholic Priest D'Souza
 Dilip Kumar as Man With Sugarcane 
 Mumtaz as Woman With Sugarcane
 Nirupa Roy as Goddess Parvati (In Play) 
 Jeevan as Narad (In Play)
 Lalita Pawar as Lalita (In Play)

Soundtrack

References

External links 
 

1968 films
1960s Hindi-language films
Films directed by A. Bhimsingh
Films scored by Laxmikant–Pyarelal
Hindi remakes of Tamil films
Films about organised crime in India
1960s action comedy films
Indian comedy thriller films
Indian films based on actual events
1960s comedy thriller films
Indian action comedy films
Fictional portrayals of the Maharashtra Police